V. S. Sobolev Institute of Geology and Mineralogy of the Siberian Branch of the RAS, IGM SB RAS is a research institute in Novosibirsk, Russia. It was founded in 2006.

History
The Institute was established on March 7, 2006.

Activity
Since 2008, the IGM SB RAS, togetger with the Institute of Cytology and Genetics, was engaged in the study of the ecosystem of Lake Solyonoye located in Bagansky District of Novosibirsk Oblast.

In 2019, a number of media sources reported that the Sobolev Institute of Geology and Mineralogy, together with the University of Arizona, determined the age of the Aral Sea.

References

Research institutes in Novosibirsk
Research institutes established in 2006
Geology organizations